German submarine U-313 was a Type VIIC U-boat of Nazi Germany's Kriegsmarine during World War II. The submarine was laid down on 11 May 1942 at the Flender Werke yard at Lübeck as yard number 313, launched on 27 March 1943 and commissioned on 20 May under the command of Kapitänleutnant Friedrich Schweiger.

During her career, the U-boat sailed on twelve combat patrols, but sank no ships before she surrendered at Narvik on 9 May 1945. She was sunk on 27 December 1945 as part of Operation Deadlight.

She was a member of eleven wolfpacks.

Design
German Type VIIC submarines were preceded by the shorter Type VIIB submarines. U-313 had a displacement of  when at the surface and  while submerged. She had two shafts and two  propellers.

U-313 was fitted with five  torpedo tubes (four fitted at the bow and one at the stern), fourteen torpedoes, one  SK C/35 naval gun, 220 rounds, and two twin  C/30 anti-aircraft guns. The boat had a complement of between forty-four and sixty.

Service history
The boat's service life began with training with the 8th U-boat Flotilla in May 1943. She was transferred to the 11th flotilla for operations on 1 January 1944. She was then reassigned to the 13th flotilla on 15 September.

She made a pair of short voyages from Kiel in Germany to Stavanger and Bergen in Norway in January 1944.

First, second and third patrols
The submarine's first patrol began with her departure from Bergen on 26 January 1944. She arrived at Hammerfest on 2 February but departed again on the seventh. She finished the patrol at Hammerfest on the 29th.

U-313 spent her second and third patrols in the Norwegian Sea.

Fourth, fifth, sixth and seventh patrols
Her fourth sortie took her as far as a point southwest of Bear Island. On 26 June 1944, she was north of Jan Mayen Island.

The boat's fifth patrol kept her closer to the Norwegian coast.

Her sixth and seventh patrols saw the submarine docking in Skillefjord on 23 September 1944, having left Narvik on the 20th. She then left the smaller port on the 26th and returned to Narvik.

Eighth, ninth and tenth patrols
For her eighth sortie, she rounded the North Cape, passing Murmansk.

Her ninth patrol was relatively short, beginning in Bodenbucht on 11 December 1944, (northwest of Narvik) and terminating in Trondheim on the 16th.

If her previous patrol was brief, her tenth effort, at 57 days, was her longest and involved sailing near to the Orkney Islands. Having departed Trondheim, the boat returned to Narvik.

Eleventh and twelfth patrols and fate
Having used Harstad (northwest of Narvik) briefly and following the German capitulation, U-313 was moved, first from Narvik to Skjomenfjord, then to Loch Eriboll in Scotland on 19 May 1945 in preparation for Operation Deadlight. She was finally transferred to Loch Ryan and sunk on 27 November.

References

Bibliography

External links

German Type VIIC submarines
U-boats commissioned in 1943
U-boats sunk in 1945
World War II submarines of Germany
1943 ships
Ships built in Lübeck
Operation Deadlight
Maritime incidents in December 1945